Paracobitis is a genus of Asian stone loaches.

Species
Fishbase currently recognises 16 species in this genus but this has been revised by other authorities with at least two species being moved to Schistura and a further two (Paracobitis  posterodorsalus and Paracobitis maolanensis) being synonymised with Triplophysa longibarbata. Additionally, new species are still being discovered occasionally. Paracobitis salihae is the most recent and was described in 2020.
 Paracobitis atrakensis Esmaeili, Mousavi-Sabet, Sayyadzadeh, Vatandoust & Freyhof, 2014 
 Paracobitis basharensis Freyhof, Esmaeili, Sayyadzadeh & Geiger, 2014  
 Paracobitis boutanensis (McClelland, 1842) 
 Paracobitis ghazniensis Bănărescu & Nalbant, 1966
 Paracobitis hagiangensis (V. H. Nguyễn, 2005)
 Paracobitis hircanica Mousavi-Sabet, Sayyadzadeh, Esmaeili, Eagderi, Patimar & Freyhof, 2015 
 Paracobitis iranica Nalbant & Bianco, 1998
 Paracobitis longicauda Kessler, 1872 (Eastern crested loach)
 Paracobitis malapterura (Valenciennes, 1846) (Western crested loach)
 Paracobitis molavii Freyhof, Esmaeili, Sayyadzadeh & Geiger, 2014  
 Paracobitis persa Freyhof, Esmaeili, Sayyadzadeh & Geiger, 2014  
 Paracobitis phongthoensis (V. H. Nguyễn, 2005)
 Paracobitis rhadinaea (Regan, 1906)
Paracobitis salihae 
 Paracobitis vignai Nalbant & Bianco, 1998
 Paracobitis zabgawraensis Freyhof, Esmaeili, Sayyadzadeh & Geiger, 2014

References

Nemacheilidae
Taxa named by Pieter Bleeker